= Mujeres del Pasado y del Presente =

Mujeres del Pasado y del Presente: Una Visión desde la Arqueología Peruana is a nonfiction book edited by Carito Tavera Medina and Lady Santana Quispe. Published in 2021 by the Instituto Peruano de Arqueología, the book contains a series of papers about gender and Peruvian archaology.

== General references ==
- Acosta Parsons, Diana Catalina (2022-09-26). "Reseña de "Mujeres del pasado y del presente. Una visión desde la arqueología peruana. Instituto Peruano de Estudios Arqueológicos, 2021"". Revista de Arqueología Histórica Argentina y Latinoamericana (in Spanish). 16 (1). doi:10.55695/rdahayl16.01.04. ISSN 2344-9918.
- Bruhns, Karen Olsen (December 2022). "Mujeres del Pasado y del Presente: Una Visión desde la Arqueología Peruana. Carito Tavera Medina and Lady Santana Quispe, editors. 2021. Instituto Peruano de Arqueología, Lima. 246 pp. + 49 illustrations. S/. 80.00 (Peruvian soles; paperback), ISBN 978-612-48266-4-4". Latin American Antiquity. 33 (4): 879–880. doi:10.1017/laq.2022.88. ISSN 1045-6635.
